Silas Green from New Orleans was an African American owned and run variety tent show that, in various forms, toured the Southern States from about 1904 through 1957. Part revue, part musicomedy, part minstrel show, the show told the adventures of short, "coal-black" Silas Green and tall, "tannish" Lilas Bean.  There was neither ever a Silas Green nor any notable connection to New Orleans. "Silas Green" was a fictional character created by the show's original writer, Salem Tutt Whitney.

History
The show was originally conceived, scored, and written by vaudeville performer Salem Tutt Whitney. The song, "Silas Green from New Orleans," debuted around 1908 in a revue by the Black Patti Troubadours, in New York. The Tutt Brothers, Whitney and J. Homer Tutt, were a comedic duo in the Troubadours show.

According to a 1941 article in the Pittsburgh Courier by Egar Theodore Rouzeau (1905–1958), the origins of the show, Silas Green from New Orleans, as produced by circus owner Prof. Eph. Williams ( Ephraim Williams; 1860–1921), was believed to have been established as an American institution by 1912, with large [racially] mixed audiences in cities throughout the South. Rouzeau qualified his statement, stating, "Records of that first peregrination of Silas Green have faded with the years, but we do know that the future of the show could not have seemed very bright to the Brothers Tutt, because they renounced all claims and turned it over, title and all, to the late Prof. Eph Williams, in lieu of services rendered as a performer."

Williams was, until his death, the only Black circus owner in America. Williams had set up his first circus in Wisconsin in 1885, and by the mid-1890s owned 100 Arabian horses and employed 26 people. His circus business collapsed around 1902, but soon afterwards he acquired the rights to Silas Green From New Orleans.

Williams set up a new company, "Prof. Eph Williams' Famous Troubadours", to tour as a tent show. His Troubadours played one-night stands throughout the South, and became one of the longest-lasting tent shows in America.  Williams managed the show and continued to perform horse tricks, alongside musicians such as Bessie Smith. By 1912, he rebranded his Famous Troubadours as Silas Green from New Orleans.

When Eph Williams died in 1921, Vivian Williams Brent (1894–1942), his oldest surviving child (of three daughters) had been handling his business. Half ownership in the show went to Charles Collier (1881–1942), who was White. The show went on the following season under the direction of Richmond C. Puggsley with Lawrence Booker directing the band and Aida I. Booker as prima donna. By 1928, the troupe employed 54 people, including a 16-piece band and 16 female dancers. The main show tent had a capacity of some 1,400.

Eventually, Collier acquired sole ownership. The show continued to tour until the late 1950s, and in later years was sometimes billed simply as the Silas Green Show.

Selected personnel

Owners and managers 
 Hortense Collier ( Wong; 1908–2002), dancer and manager. Hortense married Charles Collier around 1932; she was Chinese-American. To avoid Jim Crow laws, members of the company lived and traveled mostly in railroad cars. Commenting on racism in 1942, Hortense stated:I'm beginning to believe that the prejudice of the South is far less dangerous than the so-called tolerance of the North. A Northerner will tell you that he has no prejudice whatsoever and then he will find all sorts of ways to keep you out of employment, using one excuse or another as a pretext. That makes him a hypocrite. With a prejudiced Southerner, you always know what to expect. But once his mind is emancipated, you won't find a greater liberal anywhere than [] a Southern White man.
 Wilmer Jones became co-owner after the death of Charles Collier, with Hortense Collier as the other co-owner.

Leading actors and actresses 
 Ford Wiggins (1889–1944), a native of New Bern, North Carolina, played the lead role of Silas Green for 34 seasons – until March 10, 1944, when he died during a performance in Palm Beach, Florida. Wiggins was one of only four notable actors in that role. He jeopardized his position when, on August 28, 1924, around 5 , he shot and killed fellow performer Henry "Slim" Gallman ( Gorman or Gahlam or Gahlman or, on the death certificate, Goldman; 1892–1924) of Winston-Salem in the baggage compartment of a railway passenger car parked on a siding of the Southern Railway yard in Lexington over 5 cents in a card game where moonshine – during prohibition – played an important part. Gallman had been a singer in the chorus. Wiggins was arrested and charged with murder with a bond fixed at $1,000. Wiggins pleaded self-defense.  Clarinetist band-member Bob Young ( Robert Young), a witness, provided testimony that corroborated with Wiggins' plea. Within a year, Wiggins was back with the show in the leading role. Young, later, directed the Silas Green band.
 Ada Lockhart (1874–1938) – stage name, Aida Booker – leading actress, started her theatrical career with Black Patti and closed it out in 1929 after fifteen years with Silas Green. On July 29, 1916, she married Lawrence Booker ( Lawrence Henry Booker; 1881–1964), the show's bandmaster, who had been touring with the show since 1912. He, with Ada, retired in 1929. They both spent some of their post-theatrical years being affiliated with Bethune–Cookman College.

Producer(s) 
 Sherman H. Dudley, Jr. ( Sherman Harry Dudley; 1904–1974), the son of Sherman H. Dudley, Sr. (1872–1940), was, in 1932, brought in to take Sam H. Gray's place, who died before the debut of his new production, Money Loafing. Gray, a well-known bass singer, had arrived in 1932 to replace Lonnie Fisher.

Dancers 
 Margaret "Callie" Lee ( Margaret Calcinia Lee; 1924–1912), of Warrenton, Virginia – dancer. She was married to John Wilmer Bumbray (1922–2017).
 Nipsy Russell (1918–2005).
 Dorothy Marie Youmans of West Palm Beach, Florida – dancer from the late 1940s to early 1950s.

Musicians 
 Lawrence Booker ( Lawrence Henry Booker; 1881–1964), band director.
 Ornette Coleman (1930–2015), tenor saxophonist, in 1949, joined the Silas Green band, marking the beginning of his professional career in performing jazz. During a tour in Mississippi, he was beaten up after playing an unconventional solo. An angry mob threw his tenor off a hillside. Coleman was kicked out of the band in Natchez, Mississippi, after only two months for trying to teach a bebop tune to another player. From Natchez, Coleman made his way to New Orleans where he switched to alto sax.
 Oliver Welock Mason (1900–1961), trumpeter and brother of (i) jazz clarinetist Norman Mason (1895–1971), (ii) jazz trumpeter Henry Morris Mason (born 1906; DOD not known), and (iii) Bahamian suffragist Mary Ingraham (1901–1982).
 Amos Gilliard ( Amos London Gilliard; 1884–1935), trombonist, who had been a member of Jim Europe's 369th Infantry "Hellfighters" Band.

Musicians for Eph Williams' Famous Troubadours aka Big City Minstrels 
 Eighteen piece concert band, including:
 R. H. Collins, director
 Fred Kewley ( Fred Cecil Kewley; 1889–1953), clarinet, with his wife, Elizabeth, featured singer and dancer, toured with Eph Williams from 1911 through 1914. Fred and Elizabeth divorced in 1924 and Elizabeth went on to perform on tour in a production of Kentucky Sue. Two months after his divorce, he married Exie Preston (1897–1942). Together, they became foster parents of jazz saxophonist Ted Buckner (1913–1976). Fred was also one of Ted's saxophone teachers.
 Jessie Reeves, trombone
 R.J. Mitchell, cornet

Vocalists 
 Ida Cox (1888–1967)
 Ma Rainey (1886–1939)
 Bessie Smith (1894–1937)
 J. Homer Tutt (1882–1951) and his brother, Salem Tutt Whitney (1869–1934) toured with Eph Williams from 1888 through 1905.
 Princess White (1881–1976)

Magician 
 Alonzo Moore (1878–1930), a magician, was born and raised in Tipton, Missouri. He died on his  birthday, April 13, in Northwood Park, Cook County, Illinois.
<li> Courtesy University of Iowa Libraries
<li> (image) 
<li> (image)
<li> (image)
<li> (image)

Critical review 
In 1940, Time stated:This year their troubles start when they go to a hospital with suitcases labeled M.D. (Mule Drivers), are mistaken for two medicos, end in jail. The show is garnished with such slapstick as putting a patient to sleep by letting him smell an old shoe, such gags as "Your head sets on one end of your spine and you set on the other."  Silas gets broad at times, but never really dirty. What keeps it moving are its dances and specialty acts, its gold-toothed but good-looking chorus.

Poster art 
Historic posters advertising the shows, mostly printed by Hatch Show Print of Nashville, are popular among collectors.

Three Hatch posters for Silas Green from New Orleans can be viewed in eleven photographs by Marion Post Wolcott held the Library of Congress Prints and Photographs Division. The images are part of the Farm Security Administration–Office of War Information Photograph Collection, available online through the American Memory Project. The posters are advertising a performance for October 4, 1939, in Belzoni, Mississippi. (retrieved January 27, 2021)
<li> Title: "Itinerant salesman selling goods from his truck to Negroes in center of town on Saturday afternoon. Belzoni, Mississippi Delta, Mississippi."
<li>  (image)
<li>  (image)
<li>  (image)
<li>  (image)
<li>  (image)
<li> Title: "Some of the Negroes watching [an] itinerant salesman selling goods from his truck in center of town on Saturday afternoon. Belzoni, Mississippi Delta, Mississippi".
<li>  (image)
<li>  (image)
<li>  (image)
<li>  (image)
<li>  (image)
<li>  (image)
<li> LCCN slide show (35 images)

from a collection courtesy of the University of Georgia:
<li> (image)

Bibliography

Annotations

Notes

References
News media

 
 

 
 
 

 
 
 
 

Books, journals, magazines, and papers

 . . ; and 

 
 

 

 . .

 

 

 . . .

 

 
 

 

 . ISBNs . . .

Government, institutional, and genealogical archives

 FHL (GS) microfilm no. 1,912,791; digital folder no. 4,222,820; online image no. 425 (of 3,321); indexing project (batch) no. 48 (of 56); record no. 417.
 FHL (GS) microfilm no. 1,643,661; digital folder no. 4,008,257; online image no. 2304; reference ID 12484.
 FHL (GS) microfilm no. 1,642,995; digital folder no. 5,248,868; online image no. 1989 (of 4158) → citing NARA microfilm publication M1509; Washington, D.C.

 NARA publication no. T627; digital folder no. 5460974; microfilm image no. 310.

 (same poster, different photo courtesy of the Alabama Department of Archives and History).

Blackface minstrel troupes
American comedy troupes